Frederic Wandres (born 25 March 1987) is a German dressage rider. He competed at the 2022 FEI World Championships in Herning, where he won a Bronze team medal with the German team. Wandres competed at several World Championships for Young Dressage Horses in which he won a golden medal in 2019. He was also on the longlist for the 2020 Olympic Games in Tokyo for the German team.

He started as student rider at Hof Kasselmann in 2007, and became later stable rider. He educated and competed several young horses up to Grand Prix.

References

External links
 

Living people
1987 births
German male equestrians
German dressage riders